The Viewing Booth is a 2019 documentary film directed, co-produced and co-edited by Ra'anan Alexandrowicz. An international co-production of Israel and the United States, the film features a Jewish American college student named Maia Levy. Levy, a staunch supporter of Israel, is shown videos depicting Palestinian life under Israeli military rule in the West Bank, causing her to contemplate her worldview and her beliefs about the Israeli–Palestinian conflict.

Production
In 2017, director Ra'anan Alexandrowicz put out an open call at Temple University for participants in what would become The Viewing Booth. Seven people responded, along with Jewish American student Maia Levy, who texted Alexandrowicz that she was interested in participating. One of the original respondents was unable to participate, and so Levy took their place. Alexandrowicz stated that "Maia's politics are radically different from mine. At the same time, she's a curious and critical viewer. She doesn't shy away from images uncomfortable for her. In a nutshell, she is my ideal viewer."

Release
The Viewing Booth screened at Docaviv in Tel Aviv, Israel, in May 2019, as part of the festival's Israeli Competition. It later screened at the Berlin International Film Festival in Berlin, Germany, in 2020, as well as at Doc NYC in New York City from November 11 to November 19, 2020.

Reception

Tomris Laffly of Variety noted how "Alexandrowicz manages to zero in on the real-time emotional battle that unfolds on Maia's face" as she watches the videos presented to her. Laffly concluded: "One wonders whether The Viewing Booth could have gained something from featuring additional subjects — a broader perspective from a variety of voices, [...] These considerations aside, The Viewing Booth proves to be at its most absorbing when it resembles a cinematic infinity mirror of sorts." Joseph Fahim of Middle East Eye called the film "a fascinating, trailblazing experiment that investigates how we see and decode images, while simultaneously interrogating their veracity - or rather, in this post-structuralist world, if the image has any veracity."

References

External links
 Official website

Further reading
 Anderman, Nirit (December 5, 2020). "What Happens When a 'pro-Israeli' American Student Watches Videos of Soldiers in the West Bank". Haaretz. Retrieved January 14, 2021.

2019 documentary films
2019 films
Documentary films about the Israeli–Palestinian conflict